Khuraman Gasimova is an opera singer and actress from Azerbaijan.

Life and career
Khuraman Gasimova was born on June 6, 1951, in the former Azerbaijan Soviet Socialist Republic capital city of Baku. In 1975 she graduated from Baku Academy of Music. She has been the soloist of Azerbaijan State Academic Opera and Ballet Theater since 1976. Her opera repertoire has included roles in the modern works of Azerbaijani composers Fikret Amirov and Uzeyir Hajibeyov. In the standard opera canon, Gasimova's repertoire includes the roles of  Mimi and Muzetta (La bohème),  Desdemona (Otello), Aida (Aida), and Tatiana (Eugene Onegin).

While she was in school, she appeared in such films as The Elevator Operator Girl, But I Was Not Beautiful and The Life Examines Us. Later, she achieved success as a singer.

Awards
In 1981, Gasimova was awarded first prize at the Maria Callas Grand Prix, an international opera competition held in Athens

In 1988, she was awarded the silver medal at the 8th Tchaikovsky International Competition. In 1986, she was named a People’s Artist of Azerbaijan for her creative achievements. She also is a laureate of the State Prize of the Azerbaijani Republic and the Lenin Komsomol Prize. On June 3, 2011 she was named to the Sheref Order (Order of Glory) by the President of Azerbaijan.

Filmography
 From Heart to Heart (2007)
 Maestro Niyazi (2007)
 Film Director Hasan Seyidbeyli (2002)
 Our Sorrow…Our Pride (1998)
 Ring (1995)
 Constructors of the Future (1982)
 Land of Music (1981)
 Uzeyir’s Life (1981)
 The Life Examines Us (1972)
 But I Was Not Beautiful (1968)
 ''Gypsy Girl (1966)

References

Musicians from Baku
21st-century Azerbaijani women opera singers
Living people
1951 births
20th-century Azerbaijani women opera singers